The Snake Hill Wildlife Management Area is a hill area covering  along the Cheat canyon (78.3-mile-long) in Monongalia and Preston Counties, West Virginia. The wildlife management area mostly lies directly south of Coopers Rock State Forest, protecting the southern side of Cheat Canyon. The canyon has been the object of controversy as environmental activists contended with timber and development interests over the years of its preservation status.

See also

Animal conservation
Hunting
Fishing
List of West Virginia wildlife management areas

References

External links
West Virginia DNR District 1 Wildlife Management Areas

Wildlife management areas of West Virginia
Protected areas of Monongalia County, West Virginia
Protected areas of Preston County, West Virginia
IUCN Category V